Slow fashion is an aspect of sustainable fashion and a concept describing the opposite to fast fashion, part of the "slow movement" advocating for clothing and apparel manufacturing in respect to people, environment and animals. As such, contrary to the industrial practices of fast fashion conglomerates, slow fashion involves local artisans and the use of eco-friendly materials, with the goal of preserving crafts and the environment which, ultimately, provides value to all, slow fashion brands, consumers and retailers.

Principles

Definition 
Slow fashion is a way to "identify sustainable fashion solutions, based on the repositioning of strategies of design, production, consumption, use, and reuse, which are emerging alongside the global fashion system, and are posing a potential challenge to it." In simpler terms slow fashion is the opposite of fast fashion and it refers to a fashion awareness and approach that takes into account the procedures and resources needed to create apparel. It promotes the purchase of higher-quality clothes that will last longer, as well as equitable treatment of people, animals, and the environment.

It is an alternative to fast fashion in the sense that it promotes a more ethical and sustainable way of living and consuming. "It encompasses the whole range of 'sustainable,' 'eco,' 'green,' and 'ethical' fashion movement".  This movement is another business model that focuses on both slowing down consumerism and respecting the environment and ethics.

The key elements employed by slow fashion brands and designers include using eco-friendly materials, repurposing old or discarded textiles, using raw materials from small producers, making clothes and accessories at home in small batches, on order. New ideas and product innovations are constantly redefining slow fashion, so using a static, single definition would ignore the evolving nature of the concept.

Fast and slow fashion 
For a long time, slow fashion was defined in opposition to fast fashion.

Unlike fast fashion, slow fashion production ensures quality manufacturing to lengthen the life of the garment or material. Slow fashion garment normally has a longer product life cycle, places stress on quality, is commonly more expensive, and demands increasing awareness from manufacturers and consumers to decrease the production and consumption speed. Developing a garment with a cultural and emotional connection is also pertinent to the purpose behind slow fashion: consumers will keep an article of clothing longer than one season if they feel emotionally or culturally connected to the article of clothing. A taxation is in early stages of development in order to deter fashion companies from purchasing or producing materials that are not made with recycled, organic, or re-purposed materials. Utilizing materials already made will reduce the industry's carbon footprint.

There is also an important movement towards companies being more transparent. Many sustainable fashion companies are transparent, from manufacturing to retailing clothes, with the aim of helping buyers to make more conscious purchasing decisions. In accordance with the slow movement there is a trend towards more conscious buying as well as companies attracting new consumers with their eco-friendly processes.

Authors 
The idea of slow fashion became rampant after Elizabeth L. Cline published Overdressed: The Shockingly High Cost of Cheap Clothing and rose awareness regarding the detriments of the fast fashion industry. The term was used on blogs and the internet. However, the term "slow clothes movement" was apparently coined by Angela Murrills, a fashion writer for Georgia Straight, a Vancouver-based online news magazine.

However, the expression "slow fashion" was coined in a 2007 article by Kate Fletcher published in The Ecologist, where she compared the eco/sustainable/ethical fashion industry to the slow food movement:

Slow Food Movement advocates the following principles:

 Good: quality, flavorsome and healthy food
 Clean: production that does not harm the environment
 Fair: accessible prices for consumers and fair conditions and pay for producers

The slow fashion movement has been studied by Kate Fletcher, a researcher, author, consultant, and design activist, and the author of Sustainable Fashion and Textiles. Her writings integrated design thinking with fashion and textiles as a necessary way to move towards a more sustainable fashion industry.

Based on the three principles of slow design that were created in 2006 in Milan, Hazel Clark, in SLOW + FASHION—an Oxymoron—or a Promise for the Future…? decided to define the principles of the Slow Fashion Movement:

 taking a local approach 
 having a transparent production system 
 making sustainable and sensorial products
In 2019, Debapratim Purkayastha provided an example of how an operative in the slow fashion industry looks like with a case study of 7Weaves Social. The Assam-based social venture deals in sustainably sourced and manufactured Eri silk products by on one hand working with the forest-dependent indigenous people in the region, while on the other hand working with global slow fashion brands in the West. Eri silk is manufactured without killing the silk worm and only natural dyes were used by 7Weaves in coloring the fabric. Zero waste

The model provided sustainable livelihood to the artisan who had traditional knowledge in handloom and sericulture. 7Weaves provided guaranteed work for artisans at a fixed monthly emolument for the whole year, and redistributed 50 percent of its annual profits to the artisans and other players in the supply chain. 7Weaves's focus was also to preserve the biodiversity of the biologically rich but ecologically fragile Assam valley region. Slow fashion brands from countries including Germany, France, Belgium and Australia source garments and fabrics from 7Weaves. According, to the author, 7Weaves's focus on sustainably sourced fair trade fabrics that were long-lasting and locally produced, use of traditional values and know how, preservation of ecosystem, source diversity, and responsible business practices emphasize its slow fashion credentials.

Context 
In 2009, Vogue and The VOU Fashion Magazines traced the history of the context of the Slow Fashion Movement.

In recent years, many companies have kick-started revolutions against fast fashion, such as Fashion Revolution Day and Second Hand September campaigns. This has led to big fast fashion retailers such as Zara and H&M to either pledge or launch a clothing line dedicated to sustainable clothing.

Marketing 
Slow fashion has its own marketing strategies as it targets a certain type of consumers. Unlike fast fashion consumers, slow fashion consumers expect classic and timeless pieces of clothes, giving importance to versatility, low maintenance and a higher quality.

Marketing strategies concerning slow fashion often revolve around a more conscious consumption, focusing the advertising on environmentally and socially sustainable aspects on the clothes. Companies use several strategies in order to be less wasteful than other fast fashion brands

 changing their clothing lines less often
 producing and stocking less items
 paying attention to the material that they use
 ensuring ethical and non-exploitive methods of production

Slow fashion is also often associated with thrift shops, to the extent that shrift shops offer clothes that are not produced within a just-in-time flow.

Global economy 
Global economy has a market-driven aspect. This means that consumers are encourage to always buy more and producers are encourage to always produce more. Those two aspects mutually develop each other. The current economic model is said to be global because the production process is divided worldwide to maximize efficiency and profit. Slow fashion is more slow, local and quality-oriented. Therefore, it does not fit well in the global economy model. Several papers question the longevity of slow fashion in a market-driven society.

Production 
In slow fashion, each designer is encouraged to produce locally, meaning using local workforce and resources. Quality is chosen over quantity which means that slow fashion refuses to exploit resources or workers. The production chains is as transparent as possible. This redefines the hierarchy between designers, consumers and producers. Fashion is known to be ruled by trends who come and go quickly, which encourages consumption. The end products offered to the clients are made to last longer and be timeless.

Slow fashion has a different cost of production and cannot produce as much in quantity. Slow fashion cannot compete with the mass produced products of fast fashion that uses cheap labor and resources to maximize profits. Slow fashion is very local and used fair-trade materials and fabrics on high quality. Moreover, slow fashion is not able to be produced as much as fast fashion due to the very different production process. This is why so many academic papers have looked into the viability of this movement in an era of mass-production and mass-consumption.

By keeping the production in "productive communities", this process is more transparent, there is less intermediation and a greater cultural and material value to the consumer. This is one of the way presented by Clarke to address the question of how can slow fashion fit in the current economic model. Recently, there has also been the implementation of carbon footprint tax on fashion supply chains to encourage the use of local supply. The effect of that measures have been limited.

Pricing 
The pricing of slow fashion clothes varies a lot. Since the definition is so broad, a second-hand dress from a thrift shop worth five dollars and a designer dress costing 700 dollars can both be considered part of the slow fashion.

The current economic system focuses on economic growth and quantity sold. However, research has shown that more parameters should be included due to a raising social conscience. People have said to be willing to pay more for clothes when they know that they have been produced in "sweat-free" manufacture.

Impact 

The slow fashion movement, part of the greater goal of sustainable fashion and thus, a cleaner world is gaining strength, driven by growing environmental concerns. In 2018, a third of fashion consumers bought clothing once a month, a decrease from 37% compared to 2016, whereas those buying clothes every two or three months or less rose from 64% to 67%, according to the market research firm Mintel.

After the release of the documentary ‘The True Cost’ and ‘River Blue’, there was attention drawn to companies that have fast fashion practices. Despite the spread movement, H&M had revenues amount to $25 billion in the fiscal year of 2016. However, as the movement has grown in popularity, H&M's stock and brand image has taken a hit as consumer awareness has spread of their environmentally unethical practices leading to a drop in sales.

The spread of the movement has resulted in two fast fashion giants, Zara and H&M, switching narratives to become advocates for ethical fashion practices. With collections aimed at sustainable fashions, the two companies have shifted towards more ethical practices. Due to the audience that the movement against unethical fashion practices has accumulated, organizations such as the United States Fashion Industry Association have devoted some of their attention to ‘social compliance and sustainability’.

Critics 
Critics have called out against certain brands who have claimed to strive to follow slow fashion's principles. For example, Swedish brand H&M was accused of not being sustainable when reports found out that it burns its unsold clothes.
While H&M is striving to create sustainability to the best of their abilities, they are still overproducing mass amounts of clothing while hawking it as sustainable. H&M has a stated "sustainability strategy," and brands some items with green "Conscious" tags to signal that they contain "more sustainable materials".

See also
Ecodesign
Empathic design
Sustainable clothing
Trashion
Product tracing systems: allow to see source factory of a product

References

Fashion
2007 introductions
Fashion aesthetics
Sustainable development